This is a list of castles in Liechtenstein.

Gutenberg Castle, Balzers
Obere Burg (Burg Neu-Schellenberg), Schellenberg
Untere Burg (Burg Alt-Schellenberg), Schellenberg
Schalun Castle (Wildschloss), Vaduz 
Vaduz Castle, Vaduz

See also
List of castles

References

External links 
Overview of castles in the Principality of Liechtenstein (in German)
Photos of Luxembourg and Liechtenstein Castles

Liechtenstein
Lists of castles by country
Castles
Castles